Milleria lingnami is a moth in the family Zygaenidae. It is found in China.

References

Moths described in 1922
Chalcosiinae